Gliese 555 (HN Librae) is a red dwarf star of spectral type M4.0V, located in constellation Libra at 20.2 light-years from Earth.

Planetary system
In 2019, one planet been detected by radial velocity among other 118 planets around M dwarf stars.

References

Libra (constellation)
M-type main-sequence stars
1481
0555
071253
J14341683-1231106
Librae, NH
Durchmusterung objects
Hypothetical planetary systems